Tatobay is a Pashto language weekly newspaper based in Kabul, Afghanistan. It covers politics, entertainment, business, interest, social, sports, tech, vox pop, health, art, and cultural issues and news of the week.

History 
Tatobay Weekly Newspaper was established in 2006 as a 12-page, full-color newspaper.

The Newspaper is printing (10000) copies weekly in a standard shape on Broadsheet paper & distributing in the Kabul, Kandahar, Uruzgan, Helmand, Zabul, and Ghazni provinces of Afghanistan, also in Quetta, Chaman, and the Kuchlak area of Pakistan.

Tatobay Newspaper plan to cover all of Afghanistan provinces in the future.

Publications 
The newspaper has also held its print publications in the light of the Afghanistan national & Media/Press laws & enforcement rules in the past 10-years.

We found ourselves in the past 10-year period, that most areas of Afghanistan are still part of print media activities and print publications, Especially the South Zone of the country because we have more emphasis on print media activities add to the capital Kabul in the South Zone.

Breaking News Resource 
Tatobay Media Group launched a breaking news website Tatobaynews.com in April 2014, which currently has millions of readers and viewers.

See also 
 List of newspapers in Afghanistan 
 Pashto media
 Afghan media

References

External links
 Kandahar City Media (2010)

Pashto-language newspapers
Weekly newspapers published in Afghanistan
Publications established in 2007
Mass media in Afghanistan
Pashto mass media
2006 establishments in Afghanistan
Mass media in Kabul